The Bulgarian Women's Cup (Bulgarian: Купа на България - жени) is the national women's football cup competition in Bulgaria. It was first contested in 1985/86.

Record champion is FC NSA Sofia with 12 titles. The 2011 cup final was NSA's first lost home game since 2004, which shows the team's dominance in the cup and league.

List of finals

See also
Bulgarian Cup, men's edition

References

Bul
Football competitions in Bulgaria